Penult is a linguistics term for the second to last syllable of a word. It is an abbreviation of penultimate, which describes the next-to-last item in a series. The penult follows the antepenult and precedes the ultima. For example, the main stress falls on the penult in such English words as banána, and Mississíppi, and just about all words ending in –ic such as músic, frántic, and phonétic. Occasionally, "penult" refers to the last word but one of a sentence.

The terms are often used in reference to languages like Latin and Ancient Greek, where the position of the pitch accent or stress of a word only falls on one of the last three syllables, and sometimes in discussing poetic meter.

In certain languages, such as Welsh and Polish, stress is always on the penult.

See also
 Acute accent
 Oxytone
 Paroxytone
 Proparoxytone
 Ultima (linguistics)
 Stress (linguistics)

References

Phonology
Greek grammar